Brazil–Yugoslavia relations were historical foreign relations between Brazil and now split-up Yugoslavia (Kingdom or Socialist Federal Republic of Yugoslavia). Following the breakup of Yugoslavia and ratification of the Agreement on Succession Issues Slovenia, one of five sovereign equal successor states, has taken over properties of the Embassy of Yugoslavia in Brasilia.

History
Brazil opened its Consulate in Belgrade in 1918 while the formal bilateral relations were established in 1938. Consulate General of the Kingdom of Yugoslavia in São Paulo was opened on 31 May 1929. The first Brazilian Ambassador to the Kingdom of Yugoslavia arrived on 3 June 1939. During World War II Brazil sent a chargé d’affaires to London, specifically to liaise with the Yugoslav Government in exile. After the end of World War II in Yugoslavia and the establishment of the Socialist Federal Republic of Yugoslavia diplomatic relations between the two countries were re-established in 1946 while in 1952 the rank of the representations was raised to the embassy level. Vice President of Brazil João Café Filho visited Yugoslavia in 1951. In 1963 President of Yugoslavia Josip Broz Tito organized a month long (18 September-17 October) South American tour during which he visited Brazil, Chile, Bolivia, Peru and Mexico.

See also
 Yugoslavia and the Non-Aligned Movement
 Death and state funeral of Josip Broz Tito
 Brazil–Serbia relations
 Brazil–Slovenia relations

References

Sources
 

Brazil–Yugoslavia relations
Brazil
Yugoslavia
Bosnia and Herzegovina–Brazil relations
Brazil–Croatia relations
Brazil–Kosovo relations
Brazil–North Macedonia relations
Brazil–Serbia relations
Brazil–Slovenia relations